The NATO Agreement for the mutual safeguarding of secrecy of inventions relating to defence and for which applications for patents have been made was signed in Paris on September 21, 1960. It entered into force on January 12, 1961 following deposit of the instruments of ratification by the first two countries, namely the United States and Norway.

Countries
Iceland, a founder of NATO with no standing army, did not participate in the convention. The following countries are parties the agreement:

References

External links 
 Text of the Agreement (also here, and here, with an introduction and the Implementing Procedures, but with pages missing)
 Implementing Procedures (first revision) (also here)
 Status of ratification and accession (depositary)

NATO treaties
Intellectual property treaties
NATO relations
Military industry
Treaties concluded in 1960
Treaties entered into force in 1961
Treaties of Belgium
Treaties of Canada
Treaties of Denmark
Treaties of France
Treaties of Luxembourg
Treaties of the Netherlands
Treaties of Norway
Treaties of the Estado Novo (Portugal)
Treaties of Turkey
Treaties of the United Kingdom
Treaties of the United States
Patent law treaties
Secrecy
Treaties of Albania
Treaties of Bulgaria
Treaties of Croatia
Treaties of the Czech Republic
Treaties of Estonia
Treaties of West Germany
Treaties of the Kingdom of Greece
Treaties of Italy
Treaties of Latvia
Treaties of Lithuania
Treaties of Poland
Treaties of Romania
Treaties of Slovakia
Treaties of Slovenia
Treaties of Spain
1960 in France